Mainsat is a commune in the Creuse department in the Nouvelle-Aquitaine region in central France.

Geography

Population

Sights
 The church, dating from the nineteenth century.
 The fifteenth-century château.
 A dolmen at Pellevoisin.
 The remains of several Roman villas.
 The Château des Portes.
 Vestiges of a château at Montgrenier.

See also
Communes of the Creuse department

References

Communes of Creuse